"Slade" is an early short story (about 5,200 words) by Stephen King. In 1970, he originally published it in eight installments in the student newspaper The Maine Campus. It's a Western parody about gunslinger Jack Slade, who protects a damsel in distress against some outlaws.

Story
Gunslinger Jack Slade comes to Dead Steer Springs, called upon by Sandra Dawson, whose farm is threatened by the outlaw Sam Columbine – he wants to sell the land to the railroad. But in fact, everything is a sham; Sandra turns out to be Slade's ex-girlfriend – whom he believes dead. She couldn't get along with Slade anymore and conspired with Columbine to kill Slade. Both, however, didn't take into consideration that Slade is prone to wearing bullet-proof blue underwear (with nice flowers). Slade, playing possum after a duel, shoots both conspirators. Then he needs a joint before setting out for future adventures.

Connections to The Dark Tower
Even though Slade is, of course, a much shallower and most of all much less serious character than King's later creation Roland Deschain, Slade can be considered a first test run for the famous gunslinger:

Like Slade, Roland pines for his lost love (Susan Delgado).
Both smoke whenever possible.
Both always hit what they shoot at.
Both only speak when necessary and are used to journeying alone.
Like the gunslingers in The Dark Tower (see especially Wolves of the Calla), Slade feels the obligation to help if called upon.

Publication
The short story was originally published by The Maine Campus in eight installments, from June 11 to August 6, 1970.

According to the 1998 book Stephen King from A to Z: "It will never be issued because King considers it juvenilia and has steadfastly refused all attempts to bring it back into print, to the point of having his lawyer write a litigious letter when The Maine Campus considered reprinting it, along with King's nonfiction columns, in a book for fund-raising purposes."

See also
 Stephen King short fiction bibliography

References

External links
Official Stephen King website
Stephen King's rare stories

1970 short stories
Short stories by Stephen King
Works originally published in American magazines